Pisky (English: 'sands') may refer to several places in Ukraine:

Places
Chernihiv Oblast
Pisky, Bobrovytsia urban hromada, Nizhyn Raion, Chernihiv Oblast, village in Nizhyn Raion

Donetsk Oblast
Pisky, Pokrovsk Raion, a village near Donetsk International Airport

Mykolaiv Oblast
Pisky, Bashtanka Raion, Mykolaiv Oblast, village in Bashtanka Raion

Lviv Oblast
Pisky, Velykyi Liubin settlement hromada, Lviv Raion, Lviv Oblast, village in Lviv Raion
Pisky, Zolochiv Raion, Lviv Oblast, village in Zolochiv Raion

See also
 Peski